Elizabeth Clegg,  (born 24 March 1990) is a Scottish Paralympic sprinter who has represented both Scotland and Great Britain at international events. She represented Great Britain in the T12 100m and 200m at the 2008 Summer Paralympics, winning a silver medal in the T12 100m race. She won Gold in Rio at the 2016 Paralympic Games in 100m T11 where she broke the world record and T11 200m, beating the previous Paralympic record in the process, thus making her a double Paralympic champion.

Career history
Clegg has a deteriorating eye condition known as Stargardt's Macular Dystrophy disease giving her only slight peripheral vision in her left eye – she is registered blind. Clegg runs with the aid of guide runner Chris Clarke.

She took up athletics aged 9, joining Macclesfield Harriers AC. She originally tried middle distance running and cross country before starting sprinting.

In 2006, she competed at the IPC World Championships, winning a silver medal in the T12 200 metres. This was followed by an appearance at the 2008 Summer Olympics, where she won a silver medal in the 100 metres. From 2006 until 2010 her guide runner was Lincoln Asquith.

In January 2011, she competed in the IPC World Championships. Whilst there she took a bronze in the 200m. Clegg is a Paralympic silver medallist and current World Champion in the T12 100m and 200m sprints. She was one of the major success stories from the 2011 IPC World Championships in New Zealand and IBSA World Championships in Turkey.

In June 2012, Clegg won the 100m and 200m at the IPC Athletics European Championships.

Clegg won silver at the London Paralympics on 2 September 2012 in the T12 100m. Clegg and guide Mikail Huggins broke the European record in the final.

In October 2012, Clegg won "Para Athlete of the Year" at the Scottish Athletics awards and was presented with her award by fellow GB Paralympian David Weir. She won the award again in October 2013.

In 2013, Clegg won double silver at the IPC World Championships in Lyon clocking 12.23 and 25.31 over 100m and 200m respectively. Clegg is sponsored by the property marketing business ESPC where she participated in work experience in 2008 during her time at The Royal Blind School.

Clegg has two brothers who have also competed at the Paralympics: James, who competed in the pool in the S12 category at London 2012, and Stephen, who also swam in the same class at Rio 2016 and Tokyo 2020.

Clegg won the 2014 Commonwealth Games T11/T12 100m with a run of 12.20 seconds, a world-leading time for the year. Due to illness, she was unable to defend her European titles in Swansea shortly after the Commonwealth games.

She split with guide runner Mikhail Huggins in 2015. Her new guide runner is Chris Clarke.

She was also made to withdraw from the 2015 IPC Athletics World Championships after just one race due to an ankle injury and this also meant that she lost funding from British Athletics.

In 2016, she was reclassified as a T11 athlete due to her deteriorating eye condition, requiring her to wear a blindfold while racing. Alongside guide Chris Clarke she won the T11 100m title and 200m title at the 2016 Paralympics.

Clegg was late addition to the British team for the postponed 2020 Summer Paralympics in Tokyo on 21 July 2021. The other additions were Jonnie Peacock, Kadeena Cox and David Weir.

She is trained by Joe McDonnell.

In June 2022 she appeared as guest presenter on an episode of The Gadget Show while Georgie Barrat was on maternity leave.

Honours
Clegg was appointed Member of the Order of the British Empire (MBE) in the 2017 New Year Honours list for services to athletics and charity.

Clegg has been awarded Scottish Athletics Athlete of the Year a record seven times (in 2006, 2008, 2011, 2012, 2013, 2014, and 2016). She has also been awarded the Scottish Disability Sport Athlete of the Year for athletics (the Findlay Calder Trophy) a record six times (in 2007, 2009, 2012, 2013, 2014, and 2016). She was also voted SDS Athletes’ Athlete of the Year (the Gordon Brown Trophy) for parasports by her peers in 2012.

Personal life
In October 2018, Clegg announced she was expecting her first child with fiancé Dan Powell in March 2019. They were engaged in October 2017. She has had physical injuries and has been affected by mental health issues. Her guide dog is called Bramble.

In April 2019 Clegg gave birth to a son, Edward, via emergency C-Section 

In September 2019 it was announced she would be the first blind contestant to star in the reality TV series Dancing on Ice. She appeared in the show's 12th series in 2020 with partner Mark Hanretty, coming in third place.

References

External links

 
 
 

Living people
1990 births
Scottish female sprinters
Athletes (track and field) at the 2008 Summer Paralympics
Paralympic athletes of Great Britain
Paralympic gold medalists for Great Britain
Paralympic silver medalists for Great Britain
People from Bollington
Athletes (track and field) at the 2012 Summer Paralympics
Commonwealth Games gold medallists for Scotland
Athletes (track and field) at the 2014 Commonwealth Games
Medalists at the 2008 Summer Paralympics
Medalists at the 2012 Summer Paralympics
Medalists at the 2016 Summer Paralympics
Sportspeople from Cheshire
Commonwealth Games medallists in athletics
Athletes (track and field) at the 2016 Summer Paralympics
Scottish Paralympic competitors
Members of the Order of the British Empire
Paralympic gold medalists in athletics (track and field)
Medalists at the World Para Athletics Championships
Medalists at the World Para Athletics European Championships
Visually impaired sprinters
Paralympic sprinters
Medallists at the 2014 Commonwealth Games